The Ottawa Stakes, is a Victoria Racing Club Group 3 Australian Thoroughbred horse race for two-year-old fillies, run at set weights, over a distance of 1,000 metres at Flemington Racecourse, Melbourne, Australia in November during the VRC Spring Racing Carnival on Melbourne Cup day.  Total prizemoney is A$200,000.

History
Prior to 2005 the event was held on the third day of the VRC Spring Carnival.

Name

Prior 1985 - Ottawa Stakes
1986–1990 - race not held
1991–1993 - Beck's Bier Stakes
1994–1997 - Neat N' Trim Uniforms Stakes
1998 - Dr. Le Winn's Sprint  
1999 - Toyota Victoria Stakes 
2000 - New Honda Civic Stakes  
2001 - Subaru Stakes   
2002–2003 - Adams Platform Stakes
2004 - Myer Stakes  
2005 - Ritzenhoff Stakes
2006 - Jayco Stakes 
2007 - Herald Sun Sprint  
2008 - Schiavello Stakes   
2009 - AGL Renewable Energy Stakes
2010 - AGL Solar Power Stakes 
2011 - Emirates Airplane Plate
2012–2013 - 7 News Stakes
2014–2015 - Emirates Airplane Plate
2016 - Ottawa Stakes
2017 - Emirates 100th A380 Stakes
2018 - Bumble Stakes 
2019 - Ottawa Stakes

Distance
 1978–1979 – 1000 metres
 1980 – 1100 metres
 1981–1985 – 1200 metres
 1991 onwards - 1000 metres

Grade
 1978 - Principal Race
 1979–2012 - Listed Race
 2013 onwards - Group 3

Winners

 2022 - Charm Stone  
 2021 - See You In Heaven  
 2020 - Dosh  
2019 - Aryaaf  
2018 - Bella Rosa  
2017 - Setsuna    
2016 - Invincible Star    
2015 - Concealer    
2014 - Antelucan    
2013 - Oakleigh Girl
2012 - Villa Verde        
2011 - Applegate        
2010 - Spectrolite    
2009 - She's Got Gears    
2008 - Rostova           
2007 - Hips Don't Lie                
2006 - Royal Asscher            
2005 - Follow The Till       
2004 - Red Hot Mama            
2003 - Flying Firebird           
2002 - Rinky Dink                  
2001 - Flashed                              
2000 - True Jewels                                      
1999 - Tennessee Midnight      
1998 - Dance Baby Dance        
1997 - Rosa's Joy        
1996 - Canon Song           
1995 - Bright Light          
1994 - Tennessee Magic             
1993 - Duchess Katrin         
1992 - Lady Jakeo              
1991 - Chingquillo          
1990 - race not held  
1989 - race not held   
1988 - race not held   
1987 - race not held  
1986 - race not held  
1985 - Harbour Island       
1984 - Beach Gown           
1983 - Catalina Queen       
1982 - Convamore's Delight  
1981 - Royal Billie         
1980 - Sharp Walk           
1979 - Our Ranee Sahib      
1978 - Stage Hit             

† Run in Divisions

See also
 List of Australian Group races
 Group races

References

Horse races in Australia
Flemington Racecourse
Recurring sporting events established in 1978
1978 establishments in Australia